In superconductivity, fluxon (also called a Abrikosov vortex  and quantum vortex) is a vortex of supercurrent in a type-II superconductor, used by  Alexei Abrikosov to explain magnetic behavior of type-II superconductors. Abrikosov vortices occur generically in the Ginzburg–Landau theory of superconductivity.

Overview
The solution is a combination of fluxon solution by Fritz London, combined with a concept of core of quantum  vortex by Lars Onsager.

In the quantum vortex, supercurrent circulates around the normal (i.e. non-superconducting) core of the vortex. The core has a size  — the superconducting coherence length (parameter of a Ginzburg–Landau theory). Note that in type-II superconductors . The circulating supercurrents induce magnetic fields with the total flux equal to a single flux quantum . Therefore, an Abrikosov vortex is often called a fluxon.

The magnetic field distribution of a single vortex far from its core can be described by the same equation as in the London's fluxoid   

where  is a zeroth-order Bessel function. Note that, according to the above formula, at  the magnetic field , i.e. logarithmically diverges. In reality, for  the field is simply given by

where κ = λ/ξ is known as the Ginzburg–Landau parameter, which must be  in type-II superconductors.

Abrikosov vortices can be trapped in a type-II superconductor by chance, on defects, etc. Even if initially type-II superconductor contains no vortices, and one applies a magnetic field  larger than the lower critical field  (but smaller than the upper critical field ), the field penetrates into superconductor in terms of Abrikosov vortices. Each vortex obeys London's magnetic flux quantization and carries one quantum of magnetic flux . Abrikosov vortices form a lattice, usually triangular, with the average vortex density (flux density) approximately equal to the externally applied magnetic field. As with other lattices, defects may form as dislocations.

See also

 Flux pinning
 Ginzburg–Landau theory
 Macroscopic quantum phenomena
 Pinning force
Andreev reflection
Josephson effect
 Nielsen–Olesen vortex

References

Superconductivity
Vortices